Angélica Fuentes Téllez is a Mexican business executive and was the majority shareholder of Grupo Omnilife-Angelissima-Chivas, a multinational corporation based in Mexico composed of nutrition supplements company Omnilife, beauty and cosmetics brand Angelíssima, and the Mexican soccer team, C.D. Guadalajara, more commonly known as Chivas. She founded Angelíssima in 2010, followed by the Angélica Fuentes Foundation in 2014, dedicated to promoting women's empowerment and achievement of gender equality in Latin America.

Biography
Fuentes is the daughter of Elma Téllez and Valentín Fuentes Varela, a successful businessman in the energy sector. Angélica is the second of six siblings.

She acknowledges her father as being one of her earliest inspirations for her interest in a business career. She began her professional career working in the family business when she was 11, after convincing her father to let her work at one of his company's gas stations. While working at the gas station, she experienced discrimination for being a woman in a male-dominated industry, motivating her to work harder and generate awareness of women's rights and causes.

Angélica attended the University of Texas at El Paso, graduating with a bachelor's degree in finance.

Fuentes served as chairman of the board of Grupo Imperial Corporativo, an important player in the domestic and international energy market, where she worked for 29 years and is still a member of the board. 
 
While General Director of Grupo Imperial Corporativo, she also served as President of the Mexican Natural Gas Association from 1996 to 2000 and as a member of the Natural Gas Council and the American Gas Association.  She is currently a board member of the Monterrey Institute of Technology and Advanced Studies at Juarez, as well as that of the Mexican-United States Chamber of Commerce, the Chihuahuan Business Foundation and BBVA Bancomer.

In August 2012, she and her husband Jorge Vergara became the sole owners of the soccer team Chivas USA.

In October 2015, she was found guilty of fraudulent administration of the company Angelissima and fled to the USA while the affair was settled. In 2016, in the context of her divorce to the businessman Jorge Vergara, she was found guilty of illegally using 2.65 billion pesos (140 million dollars) from her husband's bank accounts to purchase shares of the Grupo Omnilife-Angelissima-Chivas and become owner of the group. In 2022, the Mexican IRS (SAT) publicly revealed that Angélica Fuentes Téllez owed 944 million pesos to the fiscal authorities from the 2012 fiscal year, and seized 50 of the businesswoman's brands.

Philanthropy 
Fuentes is actively engaged in charitable activity work and community involvement through the Smithsonian Foundation and the Chihuahua Project. Ms. Fuentes is a founding member of Americas Business Council Foundation. She was the co-chairwoman of the ABC's 2010 Courage Forum, where she interviewed Sir Richard Branson, CEO of the Virgin Group.

Distinctions 

 2014: 5th in Forbes Mexico's list of Most Powerful Women

Personal life 
She was married to the businessman Jorge Vergara from 2008 to 2015. They have two children.

References

External links 
 Grupo Omilife
 ABC* - Americas Business Council
 ABC* - New Generation Forum
 ABC* - Green Forum
 ABC* - Courage Forum
 Derrick Ashong
 (Video) April 28th, 2010 Presentation: Women in Power
 (Video) 2010 Courage Forum

1963 births
Living people
Mexican billionaires
Mexican company founders
21st-century Mexican businesswomen
21st-century Mexican businesspeople
People from Mexico City
20th-century Mexican businesswomen
20th-century Mexican businesspeople